Place des Pyramides is a public square in the 1st arrondissement of Paris, France. It is located in the middle of the Rue de Rivoli, at its intersection with the Rue des Pyramides and Avenue du General Lemonnier, at the eastern end of the Tuileries Garden.

The square was named for the street, Rue des Pyramides, and the street was named for the Battle of the Pyramids, a Napoleonic victory achieved in Egypt in 1798.

Description 
A riding academy under Antoine de Pluvinel, squire to Henry III, Henry IV and Louis XIII, was set up in this area in the 16th century. Known as "Le Pluvinel", this was the forerunner of the classical equestrian school, and it is commemorated by a plaque above the entrance to the Hôtel Regina restaurant.

The gilded bronze equestrian statue of Joan of Arc on this square was produced by Emmanuel Frémiet in 1874.

External links 

 Place des Pyramides on Insecula  (archived 13 February 2009)

Buildings and structures in the 1st arrondissement of Paris
Pyramides